Wilson H. Hamilton (May 1, 1877 – December 15, 1949) was a justice of the Iowa Supreme Court from January 1, 1935, to December 31, 1940, appointed from Keokuk County, Iowa.

References

External links
 

Justices of the Iowa Supreme Court
1877 births
1949 deaths